Beddegama (The Village in the Jungle) is a 1980 Sinhala drama film directed by Lester James Peries that follows the lives of village people in British Colonial Sri Lanka. The film is based on the 1913 book The Village in the Jungle by Leonard Woolf. Sir Arthur C. Clarke also has a minor role in the film as an English Judge.

Plot
The lives of a poor family in a small village called Beddagama (literally, "The village in the jungle") as they struggle to survive the challenges presented by poverty, disease, superstition, the unsympathetic colonial system, and the jungle itself. The head of the family is a hunter named Silindu, who has two daughters named Punchi Menika and Hinnihami. After being manipulated by the village authorities and a debt collector, Silindu is put on trial for murder

Cast 
 Malini Fonseka as Punchi Menika
 Joe Abeywickrama as Silindu
 Vijaya Kumaratunga as Babun
 Tony Ranasinghe as Fernando mudalali
 Nadeeka Gunasekara as Hinni hami
 Trilishya Abeykoon as Karlina hami
 D. R. Nanayakkara as Exorcist and traditional physician
 Henry Jayasena as Village head Babehami Arachchi
 Arthur C. Clarke as Leonard Woolf
 Trilicia Gunawardena as Karalina, Silindu's sister
 David Dharmakeerthi as Mudali
 Indira Abeydheera as Nanchohami
 Vincent Vaas

See also 
 List of Sri Lankan films

References

External links

National Film Corporation of Sri Lanka - Official Website
Sri Lankan Lagest Sinhala Films Online - Online Watch
Official website of Lester James Peries in association with Ministry of Cultural Affairs, Sri Lanka
San Francisco International Film Festival

1980 films
1980s Sinhala-language films
Films directed by Lester James Peries